Alexander MacRobert may refer to:

Alexander Munro MacRobert (1873-1930), Scottish Unionist politician
Sir Alexander MacRobert of the MacRobert Baronets
Alexander McRobert (Virginia politician) on List of mayors of Richmond, Virginia